The 1994 Supercopa de España was a two-legged Spanish football match played on 27 August and 30 August 1994. It was contested by Barcelona, who won the 1993–94 Spanish League, and Zaragoza, who were Spanish Cup winners in 1993–94. Barcelona won 6–5 on aggregate.

Match details

First leg

Second leg

References
 List of Super Cup Finals 1994 RSSSF.com

Supercopa de Espana Final
Supercopa de España
Supercopa de Espana 1994
Supercopa de Espana 1994